Saint John's or St. John's may refer to:

Places

Antigua and Barbuda 

 St. John's, Antigua and Barbuda, location of the Parliament of Antigua and Barbuda
 Saint John Parish, Antigua and Barbuda, of which St. John's is a part

Australia
 St Johns, South Australia
 St Johns Wood, Queensland, a neighbourhood in Brisbane, Australia

Canada 
 St. John's, Newfoundland and Labrador
 St. Johns (provincial electoral district), in North Winnipeg
 St. John's (electoral district), a defunct federal riding in Quebec from 1867 to 1892
 St. Johns, Ontario
 Saint John, New Brunswick
 St. John's Island, British colony from 1763 to 1798 when it was renamed Prince Edward Island
 St. Johns and Fort St-Jean, now called Saint-Jean-sur-Richelieu

Ireland 
 St. Johns Point, County Donegal, a Headland and Lighthouse in County Donegal
 St. Johns, County Kildare, a civil parish in County Kildare
 St. Johns, County Roscommon, a civil parish in County Roscommon

New Zealand 
 St Johns, New Zealand, a suburb of Auckland
 St John's Bush, New Zealand, a reserve in Auckland

United Kingdom 
 St John's, Isle of Man
 St Johns, London, England
 St John's, Redhill, Surrey, a hamlet adjoining the town of Redhill
 St. John's, Surrey, England
 St John's, South Yorkshire, England
 St Johns, Worcester, England
 St John's Ward, Ipswich, Suffolk
 St John's Wood, London, England
 St John's Lane, the home of Bristol City F.C. until 1904
 St John's Rock, a 19th-century name for Dubh Artach, Scotland
 Saint John's Point, County Down, N. Ireland, a cape at the end of the Lecale Peninsula

United States 
 St. Johns, Arizona
 St. Johns, Maricopa County, Arizona
 St. John's River (California)
 St. Johns, Florida
 Port St. John, Florida
 St. Johns County, Florida
 St. Johns River, Florida
 St. Johns, Illinois
 Saint Johns, Indiana
 St. Johns, Michigan
 Saint Johns, Ohio
 St. Johns, Portland, Oregon
 Saint John, U.S. Virgin Islands

Elsewhere 
 St. Johns, Saba, a village on the Caribbean island of Saba, a special municipality of the Netherlands
 Saint John's Island, Singapore

Education
 Saint John's College (disambiguation)
 Saint John's University (disambiguation)
 St. John's Preparatory School (disambiguation)
 St. John's School (disambiguation)
 St. John's Seminary (disambiguation)

Other uses
 Saint John's Health Center, Santa Monica, California
 St. John's Mine, a cinnabar mine in Vallejo, California
 St. John's Red Storm, the athletic program of St. John's University in New York City
 St Johns railway station, in the southeast London borough of Lewisham
 Adela Rogers St. Johns (1894–1988), American writer
 HMCS St. John's (FFH 340), a Halifax-class frigate in the Canadian Navy
 Hypericum perforatum, St John's wort herb
 Leeds St Johns, a British rugby league football club today known as Leeds Rhinos
 Saint John's Arms, another name for the looped square (⌘)

See also
 Saint John (disambiguation)
 St. John's Cathedral (disambiguation)
 St. John's Church (disambiguation)
 St. Johns, Florida (disambiguation)
 St. John's Regional Medical Center (disambiguation)
 Saint Johnstown (disambiguation)